Liechtenstein has recognized same-sex registered partnerships since 1 September 2011 following approval by voters in a referendum.

Registered partnerships
On 19 November 2001, MP Paul Vogt from the Free List submitted a registered partnership initiative to the Landtag of Liechtenstein, which after a long discussion referred it to the Cabinet for its opinion. The goal of reducing discrimination was undisputed; rather the kind of recognition and the timing compared to neighbouring countries were cause for discussion. On 15 April 2003, the Cabinet published its position on the matter; it compared the legal situation in Liechtenstein with European countries with recognition of same-sex couples (e.g. Germany had recently introduced registered life partnerships), but also with neighbouring Austria and Switzerland, which had no legal recognition of same-sex couples at the time. As the Cabinet saw no urgent need and preferred to await developments in Austria and especially Switzerland, it recommended rejection. On 14 May 2003, the Landtag discussed and rejected the initiative.

On 17 September 2007, Amnesty International submitted a petition calling for the legal recognition of same-sex couples. A subsequent motion put forward in the Landtag by the Free List requesting that the Cabinet introduce a registered partnership law similar to Switzerland's passed on 24 October 2007 with 19 representatives voting in favour and 6 voting against.

a. Part of the FBP-VU Coalition under Prime Minister Otmar Hasler.

In December 2009, Justice Minister Aurelia Frick announced she would finalise a draft of the registered partnership bill by January 2010. The draft was presented in April 2010. After the consultation period for the bill finished on 16 July, a few items were amended as a result of the discussion. The bill was described as very similar to the Austrian law passed in autumn 2009. In August 2010, Prince Alois declared his support for the proposal. On 23 November 2010, the Cabinet formulated the final version of the bill, which was approved by Parliament in its first reading on 16 December 2010. It passed its second reading on 16 March 2011 in a 21–0 vote, and was published on 21 March as the Registered Partnership Act.

a. Part of the VU-FBP Coalition under Prime Minister Klaus Tschütscher.
b. Served as a substitute deputy for Günther Kranz in the afternoon session.

According to a report approved by the government in October 2022, the partnership law uses "gender-equitable formulations" in its general clauses and legal definitions, implying that both same-sex and opposite-sex couples can enter into registered partnerships under the current law.

Referendum

A group called Vox Populi ("Voice of the People") announced its intention to force a referendum on the new law. According to the Constitution of Liechtenstein, the organization had until 21 April (30 days) to collect at least 1,000 signatures. As the necessary signatures were gathered (1,208 valid signatures), a referendum was held between 17 and 19 June 2011. The registered partnership law was approved by 68.8 percent of those who voted and thus went into effect on 1 September 2011.

By municipality, the "Yes" vote received its largest support in Planken (at 73.4%), followed by Schaan (73.0%) and Ruggell (72.4%), whereas the highest "No" vote was recorded in Eschen (40.8%).

Family name
In 2016, the Cabinet of Liechtenstein reformed family name law. Registered partners are now allowed to have a common family name; however, it is simply called "name" as opposed to "family name" for married couples, thus keeping a distinction. The reform was discussed in the Landtag on 4 March 2016 at first reading, and was approved in its second and final reading on 31 August 2016 by a vote of 25–0. It was published in the official gazette on 3 November 2016 and took effect on 1 January 2017.

Adoption rights
On 15 June 2021, the State Court of Liechtenstein ruled that registered partners should have the right to adopt, and invalidated the sections of the 2011 partnership law which had forbidden such adoptions. It gave Parliament one year to rectify the issue. Following the court decision, the government drafted a bill granting same-sex couples the right to adopt their stepchildren (i.e. stepchild adoption), which was passed on 6 May 2022. On that same day, Parliament narrowly rejected an amendment that would have excluded same-sex couples from access to joint adoption and assisted reproductive technology. 

After a consultation period lasting from 6 July to 30 September 2022, the government passed a motion for full adoption equality for same-sex couples on 31 October 2022. The proposal was discussed at first reading in the Landtag on 2 December 2022 and was passed in a 22 to 3 vote. It was approved in its final reading in March 2023. The law awaits royal assent and is set to go into effect in June 2023.

Statistics
Eleven registered partnerships were performed in the first two years following the entry into force of the new law. This made up 2.7% of all unions performed those two years. 8 partnerships were between male couples and 3 were between female couples. The number of registered partnerships performed in Liechtenstein per year is shown in the table below. The data is collected by the Office of Statistics (Amt für Statistik).

Same-sex marriage

Background
In June 2017, Justice Minister Aurelia Frick said she was open to a public debate on the legalisation of same-sex marriage. MP Daniel Seger from the Progressive Citizens' Party (FBP), who helped draft the partnership law, welcomed the legalisation of same-sex marriage in Germany and hoped Liechtenstein would follow suit.

In 2018, a same-sex couple, Lukas Oehri and Dario Kleeb, were denied a marriage license at the Civil Registry Office in Vaduz. They filed suit in court, arguing that the same-sex marriage ban was a violation of the European Convention on Human Rights and the Constitution of Liechtenstein. The Administrative Court (VGH, Verwaltungsgerichtshof) ruled in the couple's favour, but the judgement was overturned on appeal by the State Court (StGH, Staatsgerichtshof) in September 2019. The StGH ruled, in case 2018/154, that banning same-sex marriage was not unconstitutional. However, the court concluded that several provisions of the 2011 partnership law were discriminatory, notably its provisions prohibiting registered partners from adopting. In response, the government announced it would evaluate the issue after "careful discussion".

Attempts at legalisation (2021–present)
Following the Swiss National Council's vote to legalize same-sex marriage on 11 June 2020, Amos Kaufmann from the LGBT group Flay expressed his hope that Liechtenstein would soon follow suit. The Liechtensteiner Vaterland newspaper wrote that the issue might "soon be on the political arena". Minister of Social Affairs Mauro Pedrazzini said he expected discussion on the issue to become quite present in the lead up to the February 2021 parliamentary election. A spokesman for the Pariotic Union (VU) said the party had "more pressing issues", but said they would follow the developments in Switzerland and take a formal decision later on. FBP party president Marcus Vogt said the party was still debating whether to take an official stance in support of same-sex marriage. In an interview with Radio Liechtenstein in February 2021, Prince Hans-Adam II expressed his support for same-sex marriage but said he opposed allowing same-sex couples to adopt. During the February 2021 election campaign, over 80% of candidates for the Landtag said they supported legalising same-sex marriage. Following the election, the Liechtensteiner Vaterland reported that there is a "solid majority" in the Landtag to legalise same-sex marriage. On 24 March 2021, the VU and the FBP signed a coalition agreement forming the next government, with the government programmme including the promise that "legal certainty for non-traditional family models will be improved".

A survey conducted by the youth wing of the Free List party, leading up to the 2021 general election, showed that the vast majority of elected representatives supported same-sex marriage, with the Free List, the FBP, and a large majority of the VU in support. The 2 members of the minor Democrats for Liechtenstein party did not respond to the survey. 10 lawmakers were regarded as a "solid yes" vote, 9 as a "likely yes" vote, 3 as a "likely no" vote, and 1 as a "solid no" vote. Out of the 10 elected substitute members (who serve as substitute representatives in the event that an MP cannot attend a parliamentary session), 8 of them responded to the survey, with 5 regarded as a "solid yes" vote, 2 as a "likely yes" vote,  and 1 as a "likely no" vote. On 29 September 2021, the Landtag held a debate in which the majority of political parties broadly agreed that same-sex marriage should be legalized. It has called for a public consultation before legislating on the issue. On 11 August 2022, Prince Alois said that same-sex marriage is "not a major problem". On 21 September 2022, a motion calling on the government to introduce a bill legalizing same-sex marriage was submitted to the Landtag by 15 out of the 25 sitting members. The motion was discussed in the plenary session on 2 November 2022, and was passed by a 23–2 vote.

a. Part of the VU-FBP Coalition under Prime Minister Daniel Risch.
b. Served as a substitute deputy for Mario Wohlwend throughout the plenary legislative session.

Protesting the passage of the motion, Archbishop Wolfgang Haas of the Archdiocese of Vaduz announced in December 2022 that he would cancel a Mass traditionally held on New Year's Day at the opening session of Parliament. Haas said same-sex marriage "runs counter to natural sensibility, to natural law in accordance with reason and, in particular, to the Christian concept of the human being."

Public opinion
In June 2017, following the approval of a same-sex marriage law by the German Bundestag, the Liechtensteiner Vaterland commissioned an online opinion poll wherein it asked its readers whether they support or oppose the legalisation of same-sex marriages in Liechtenstein. 55% answered "yes and as quickly as possible" and another 14% answered "yes" but were opposed to or had difficulties supporting adoption by same-sex spouses. 27% opposed same-sex marriage, while the remaining 4% were undecided or indifferent.

A poll conducted in February 2021 by the Liechtenstein Institute showed that a majority of voters from each political party answered positively when asked "Should same-sex couples have the same rights as heterosexual couples in all areas?". In total, 72% of voters supported same-sex marriage (48% "Yes", 24% "Rather Yes") and 28% opposed (14% "No", 14% "Rather No"). Voters from the Free List were the most supportive (96% in favour, 4% opposed), followed by voters from the Progressive Citizens' Party (74% in favour, 27% opposed), the Patriotic Union (68% in favour, 32% opposed), independents (65% in favour, 35% opposed) and the Democrats for Liechtenstein (55% in favour, 45% opposed).

See also
 LGBT rights in Liechtenstein
 Recognition of same-sex unions in Europe

Notes

References

External links
 Gesetz über die eingetragene Partnerschaft gleichgeschlechtlicher Paare (Partnerschaftsgesetz; PartG), LILEX (in German)

LGBT rights in Liechtenstein
Liechtenstein